Dwarfina is a 2011 Philippine television drama romance fantasy series broadcast by GMA Network. Directed by Mike Tuviera, it stars Heart Evangelista in the title role and Dennis Trillo. It premiered on January 10, 2011 on the network's Telebabad line up replacing Grazilda. The series concluded on May 6, 2011 with a total of 83 episodes. It was replaced by Munting Heredera in its timeslot.

The series is streaming online on YouTube.

Cast and characters

Lead cast
 Heart Evangelista as Dwarfina / Yna / Fina
 Dennis Trillo as Lyndon

Supporting cast
 Janice de Belen as Marissa
 Cris Villanueva as Kardo
 Chanda Romero as Selya
 Mark Bautista as Estong
 Iwa Moto as Lucille
 Kylie Padilla as Chloe
 Derrick Monasterio as Darius
 Yogo Singh as Buddy
 Jestoni Alarcon as Dito Calixto
 Jackie Lou Blanco as Dita Aviana
 Angelika Dela Cruz as Romera
 Emilio Garcia as Hulyanto
 Pauleen Luna as Gwendina
 Tony Mabesa as Nuno Umberto
 Will Devaughn as Elvin
 Gerard Pizarras as Marcell
 Bearwin Meily as Willy
 Vaness del Moral as Kamila
 Mico Aytona as Dwentukin
 Leah Scarlet Boises as Hilda

Guest cast
 Lani Mercado as Andrea
 Glenda Garcia as Susan
 John Apacible as Andong
 Lloyd Samartino as Orland
 Junyka Santarin as young Fina / Dwarfina
 Nathaniel Britt as young Lyndon 
 Christine Joy De Guzman as young Lucille
 Scott Murthy McKenzel as young Elvin
 Jhiz Deocardez as young Dwentukin
 Edelweise Tuaven as young Gwendina
 Princess Gamboa as young Dita
 Lala Tan as young Kamila
 Bella Flores as Flora
 Jaya as Lelang Gorya
 Fabio Ide as Dwenstein / Dwendelstilskin
 Sheena Halili as Sabrina
 Rufa Mae Quinto as Dwenkikay

Ratings
According to AGB Nielsen Philippines' Mega Manila People/Individual television ratings, the pilot episode of Dwarfina earned a 15.4% rating. While the final episode scored a 12% rating.

References

External links
 
 

2011 Philippine television series debuts
2011 Philippine television series endings
Fantaserye and telefantasya
Filipino-language television shows
GMA Network drama series
Philippine romance television series
Television shows set in the Philippines